Tricoryne elatior  (common name yellow autumn-lily, yellow rush-lily) is a species of flowering plant in the family Asphodelaceae, native to Australia, and found in all its states and territories.

Description 
Tricoryne elatior is a rhizomatous perennial herb, with fibrous roots, It grows to a height  of 10-40 cm  but sometimes grows to 1 m. The leaves are linear, 5–10 cm by 1–3.5 mm wide, and usually glabrous. The flowering axis is terete, and has a smooth surface although sometimes there are scabrous hairs at the axis base. The umbels carry  2–10 flowers on pedicels which are about 1.5–6 mm long. The outer tepals are oblong, acute, three-veined, and  6–14 mm by 1.5–3 mm, while the inner tepals are elliptic, obtuse, three-veined, and 5–10 mm by 3–4 mm wide. The tepals twist spirally after flowering and later fall.  There are six stamens which are attached to the base of the perianth. The filaments are 3–6 mm long with tufts of clavate hairs below the anthers  (which are ovate, and 0.6–0.9 mm long).   The mericarps are ellipsoidal, and 3–6 mm by 1.5–3.5 mm and slightly reticulate.

Habitat 
It is found in sclerophyll forests, in heaths and woodlands,  and sometimes in swamps, growing on sandy loams and lateritic soils.

References

External links
Tricoryne elatior occurrence data from Australasian Virtual Herbarium

Flora of Australia
elatior
Plants described in 1810
Taxa named by Robert Brown (botanist, born 1773)